The following low-power television stations broadcast on digital or analog channel 47 in the United States:

 K47HT in Roseburg, Oregon, to move to channel 14
 K47JC-D in Wadena, Minnesota, to move to channel 22
 K47JE-D in Olivia, Minnesota, to move to channel 15
 K47JK-D in Pocatello, Idaho, to move to channel 20
 K47LM-D in Prineville, etc., Oregon
 KWCC-LD in Wenatchee, Washington, to move to channel 25
 KWWO-LD in Walla Walla, Washington, Washington, to move to channel 32

The following television stations, which are no longer licensed, formerly broadcast on analog or digital channel 47 in the United States:
 K47AC in Silt, etc., Colorado
 K47AL in Ukiah, California
 K47AN in Duchesne, Utah
 K47BP-D in Follett, Texas
 K47BW in Lewiston, etc., Idaho
 K47DR in Farmington, New Mexico
 K47ED in College Station, Texas
 K47EH in Alturas, etc., California
 K47GD in San Luis Obispo, California
 K47GM-D in New Mobeetie, Texas
 K47HD in Emery, Utah
 K47IP in Snyder, Texas
 K47KA in Minot, North Dakota
 K47KE in Huntsville, Utah
 KCST-LP in Hoquiam, Washington
 KDFQ-LP in Prescott, Arizona
 KGDR-LP in Ruidoso, New Mexico
 KGNG-LP in Las Vegas, Nevada
 KIJR-LP in Lucerne Valley, California
 KKNF-LD in Lufkin, Texas
 KLPN-LD in Longview, Texas
 W47AC in Big Pine Key, Florida
 W47CK in Shallotte, North Carolina
 W47DA in Melbourne, Florida
 W47DM-D in Cullowhee, North Carolina
 W47DX-D in Canovanas, Puerto Rico
 WEKK-LD in Wausau, Wisconsin

References

47 low-power TV stations in the United States